The Boșneag is a left tributary of the Danube in Romania. It flows into the Danube in Moldova Veche.

References

Rivers of Romania
Rivers of Caraș-Severin County